Radiophobia is a fear of ionizing radiation. Examples include health patients refusing X-rays because they believe the radiation will kill them, such as Steve Jobs and Bob Marley who both died after refusing radiation treatment for their cancer. Given that significant doses of radiation are harmful, even deadly (i.e. radiation-induced cancer, and acute radiation syndrome) it is reasonable to fear high doses of radiation. The term is also used to describe the opposition to the use of nuclear technology (i.e. nuclear power) arising from concerns disproportionately greater than actual risks would merit.

Early use 
The term was used in a paper entitled "Radio-phobia and radio-mania" presented by Dr Albert Soiland of Los Angeles in 1903. In the 1920s, the term was used to describe people who were afraid of radio broadcasting and receiving technology. In 1931, radiophobia was referred to in The Salt Lake Tribune as a "fear of loudspeakers", an affliction that Joan Crawford was reported as suffering. The term "radiophobia" was also printed in Australian newspapers in the 1930s and 1940s, assuming a similar meaning. The 1949 poem by Margarent Mercia Baker entitled "Radiophobia" laments the intrusion of advertising into radio broadcasts. The term remained in use with its original association with radios and radio broadcasting during the 1940s and 1950s.

During the 1950s and 1960s, the Science Service associated the term with fear of gamma radiation and the medical use of x-rays. A Science Service article published in several American newspapers proposed that "radiophobia" could be attributed to the publication of information regarding the "genetic hazards" of exposure to ionising radiation by the National Academy of Sciences in 1956.

In a newspaper column published in 1970, Dr Harold Pettit MD wrote:"A healthy respect for the hazards of radiation is desirable. When atomic testing began in the early 1950s, these hazards were grossly exaggerated, producing a new psychological disorder which has been called "radiophobia" or "nuclear neurosis".

Castle Bravo and its influence on public perception
March 1, 1954, the operation Castle Bravo testing of a then, first of its kind, experimental thermonuclear Shrimp device, overshot its predicted yield of 4–6 megatons and instead produced 15 megatons; this resulted in an unanticipated amount of Bikini snow or visible particles of nuclear fallout being produced, fallout which caught the Japanese fishing boat the Daigo Fukuryū Maru or Lucky Dragon in its plume, even though it was fishing outside the initially predicted ~5 megaton fallout area which had been cordoned off for the Castle Bravo test. Approximately 2 weeks after the test and fallout exposure, the 23-member fishing crew began to fall ill, with acute radiation sickness, largely brought on by beta burns which were caused by direct contact between the Bikini snow fallout and their skin, through their practice of scooping the "Bikini snow" into bags with their bare hands. Kuboyama Aikichi, the boat's chief radioman, died 7 months later, on September 23, 1954. It was later estimated that about a hundred fishing boats were contaminated to some degree by fallout from the test. Inhabitants of the Marshall Islands were also exposed to fallout, and a number of islands had to be evacuated.

This incident, due to the era of secrecy around nuclear weapons, created widespread fear of uncontrolled and unpredictable nuclear weapons, and also of radioactively contaminated fish affecting the Japanese food supply. With the publication of Joseph Rotblat's findings that the contamination caused by the fallout from the Castle Bravo test was nearly a thousand times greater than that stated officially, outcry in Japan reached such a level that the incident was dubbed by some as "a second Hiroshima". To prevent the subsequent strong anti-nuclear movement from turning into an anti-American movement, the Japanese and U.S. governments agreed on compensation of 2 million dollars for the contaminated fishery, with the surviving 22 crew men receiving about ¥ 2 million each ($5,556 in 1954, $ in ).

The surviving crew members, and their family, would later experience prejudice and discrimination, as local people thought that radiation was contagious.

In popular culture 
The Castle Bravo test and the new fears of radioactive fallout inspired a new direction in art and cinema. The Godzilla films, beginning with Ishirō Honda's landmark 1954 film Gojira, are strong metaphors for post-war radiophobia. The opening scene of Gojira echoes the story of the Daigo Fukuryū Maru, from the initial distant flash of light to survivors being found with radiation burns. Although he found the special effects unconvincing, Roger Ebert stated that the film was "an important one" and "properly decoded, was the Fahrenheit 9/11 of its time."

A year after the Castle Bravo test, Akira Kurosawa examined one person's unreasoning terror of radiation and nuclear war in his 1955 film I Live in Fear. At the end of the film, the foundry worker who lives in fear has been declared incompetent by his family, but the possible partial validity of his fears has transferred over to his doctor.

Nevil Shute's 1957 novel On the Beach depicts a future just six years later, based on the premise that a nuclear war has released so much radioactive fallout that all life in the Northern Hemisphere has been killed. The novel is set in Australia, which, along with the rest of the Southern Hemisphere, awaits a similar and inevitable fate. Helen Caldicott describes reading the novel in adolescence as 'a formative event' in her becoming part of the anti-nuclear movement.

Radiophobia and Chernobyl
In the former Soviet Union many patients with negligible radioactive exposure after the Chernobyl disaster displayed extreme anxiety about low level radiation exposure, and therefore developed many psychosomatic problems, with an increase in fatalistic alcoholism also being observed. As Japanese health and radiation specialist Shunichi Yamashita noted: 

The term "radiation phobia syndrome" was introduced in  1987. by L. A. Ilyin and O. A. Pavlovsky in their report "Radiological consequences of the Chernobyl accident in the Soviet Union and measures taken to mitigate their impact".

The author of Chernobyl Poems Lyubov Sirota  wrote in her poem "Radiophobia":
Is this only—a fear of radiation? 
Perhaps rather—a fear of wars? 
Perhaps—the dread of betrayal, 
Cowardice, stupidity, lawlessness?

The term has been criticized by Adolph Kharash, Science Director at the Moscow State University because, he writes, It treats the normal impulse to self-protection, natural to everything living, your moral suffering, your anguish and your concern about the fate of your children, relatives and friends, and your own physical suffering and sickness as a result of delirium, of pathological perversion

However, the psychological phobia of radiation in sufferers may not coincide with an actual life-threatening exposure to an individual or their children.  Radiophobia refers only to a display of anxiety disproportionate to the actual quantity of radiation one is exposed to, with, in many cases, radiation exposure values equal to, or not much higher than, that which individuals are naturally exposed to every day from background radiation. Anxiety following a response to an actual life-threatening level of exposure to radiation is not considered to be radiophobia, nor misplaced anxiety, but a normal, appropriate response.

Marvin Goldman is an American doctor who provided commentary to newspapers claiming that radiophobia had taken a larger toll than the fallout itself had, and that radiophobia was to blame.

Chernobyl abortions
Following the accident, journalists mistrusted many medical professionals (such as the spokesman from the UK National Radiological Protection Board), and in turn encouraged the public to mistrust them.

Throughout the European continent, in nations where abortion is legal, many requests for induced abortions, of otherwise normal pregnancies, were obtained out of fears of radiation from Chernobyl; including an excess number of abortions of healthy human fetuses in Denmark in the months following the accident.

In Greece, following the accident there was panic and false rumors which led to many obstetricians initially thinking it prudent to interrupt otherwise wanted pregnancies and/or were unable to resist requests from worried pregnant mothers over fears of radiation, within a few weeks misconceptions within the medical profession were largely cleared up, although worries persisted in the general population. Although it was determined that the effective dose to Greeks would not exceed 1 mSv (0.1 rem), a dose much lower than that which could induce embryonic abnormalities or other non-stochastic effects, there was an observed 2500 excess of otherwise wanted pregnancies being terminated, probably out of fear in the mother of some kind of perceived radiation risk.

A "slightly" above the expected number of requested induced abortions occurred in Italy, where upon request, "a week of reflection" and then a 2 to 3 week "health system" delay usually occur before the procedure.

Radiophobia and health effects

The term "radiophobia" is also sometimes used in the arguments against proponents of the conservative LNT concept (Linear no-threshold response model for ionizing radiation) of radiation security proposed by the U.S. National Council on Radiation Protection and Measurements (NCRP) in 1949. The "no-threshold" position effectively assumes, from data extrapolated from the atomic bombings on Hiroshima and Nagasaki, that even negligible doses of radiation increase ones risk of cancer linearly as the exposure increases from a value of 0 up to high dose rates. The LNT model therefore suggests that radiation exposure from naturally occurring background radiation may be harmful. There is no biological evidence and weak statistical evidence that doses below 100 mSv have any biological effect.

After the Fukushima disaster, the German news magazine Der Spiegel reported that Japanese residents were suffering from radiophobia. British medical scientist Geraldine Thomas has also attributed suffering of the Japanese to radiophobia in interviews and formal presentations.  Four years after the event The New York Times reported that ″about 1,600 people died from the stress of the evacuation″. The forced evacuation of 154,000 people ″was not justified by the relatively moderate radiation levels″, but it was ordered because ″the government basically panicked″.

At the same time as part of the public fears radiation, some commercial products are also promoted on the basis of their radioactive content, such as "negative ion" bracelets or radon spas.

Radiophobia and industrial and healthcare use
Radiation, most commonly in the form of X-rays, is used frequently in society in order to produce positive outcomes. The primary use of radiation in healthcare is in the use of radiography for radiographic examination or procedure, and in the use of radiotherapy in the treatment of cancerous conditions. Radiophobia can be a fear which patients experience before and after either of these procedures, it is therefore the responsibility of the healthcare professional at the time, often a Radiographer or Radiation Therapist, to reassure the patients about the stochastic and deterministic effects of radiation on human physiology. Advising patients and other irradiated persons of the various radiation protection measures that are enforced, including the use of lead-rubber aprons, dosimetry and Automatic Exposure Control (AEC) is a common method of informing and reassuring radiophobia sufferers.

Similarly, in industrial radiography there is the possibility of persons to experience radiophobia when radiophobia sufferers are near industrial radiographic equipment.

See also
Electromagnetic hypersensitivity
Atomic Age
Background radiation
Backscatter X-ray
Chernobyl: Consequences of the Catastrophe for People and the Environment
Dirty bomb
Electromagnetic radiation and health
Fear mongering
Nuclear power debate

References

External links
 
 
 
 
 

Phobias
Radiation